Belenois rubrosignata, the red-edged white, is a butterfly in the family Pieridae. It is found in Angola, the Democratic Republic of the Congo, Zambia, Malawi, Tanzania, Uganda, Kenya and Somalia. The habitat consists of dense woodland.

The larvae feed on Ritchiea species.

Subspecies
Belenois rubrosignata rubrosignata (Angola, Democratic Republic of the Congo, northern Zambia)
Belenois rubrosignata kongwana Talbot, 1943 (Malawi, Tanzania, southern Uganda)
Belenois rubrosignata peeli Dixey, 1900 (Somalia, Kenya)

References

Butterflies described in 1901
Pierini